Epsilon Antliae, Latinized from ε Antliae, is the Bayer designation for a single star in the southern constellation of Antlia, being positioned near the western constellation border and forming part of the main asterism. The apparent visual magnitude of this star is +4.51, which means it is visible to the naked eye. From parallax measurements, the distance to this star is known to be . It is drifting further away from the Sun with  a radial velocity of +22 km/s.

The stellar classification of this star is K3 IIIa, where the luminosity class of III indicates that this is an evolved giant star that has exhausted the supply of hydrogen at its core. It has expanded to around 56 times the radius of the Sun and radiates approximately 919 times the Sun's luminosity from its photosphere at an effective temperature of 4,237 K. Photometry measurements during the Hipparcos mission indicate that this star is undergoing periodic variability by 0.0034 magnitudes over an 11.07941 day cycle.

See also
Antlia 2

References

K-type giants
Antlia
Antliae, Epsilon
Durchmusterung objects
082150
046515
3765